Ninaithale Inikkum ( It's sweet, when we think) is an Indian Tamil-language television drama airing on Zee Tamil and streams on ZEE5. The series has been produced by Monk Studios and directed by N. Priyan. It premiered on 23 August 2021 and starring Swathi Sharma and Anand Selvan. The series is an official remake of Zee Bangla TV series Mithai.

Plot
Bommi is a joyous, naughty woman whose father is dead and her mother Krishnaveni have a serious stomach problem. Bommi father's brother Azhagesan is innocent whereas his wife Sakunthala is cruel to Bommi. Sakunthala wants her brother Thavamani to marry Bommi but he is a criminal, So Krishnaveni and Bommi avoids him. Meanwhile, Siddharth (Sid) is a silent, reserved man who lost his mother at very young age, he thinks that his mother's death is because of his father, so he never talks to him. His family consists of his grandpa Deivanayagam; his grandma Anjali Devi; father Padmanaban; paternal aunt Valarmathi; paternal uncle Chidambaram; cousin brothers Vinay and Lokesh; sister Ramya and his own sister Dharshini. He obeys his grandfather because who supported his mother during her final days. Tamannah, a colleague and friend of Sid, also loves him but Sid doesn't reciprocate her feelings.

One day Thavamani tried to wed Bommi one day, but she dumped him and left the home with her mother, Krishnaveni and brother, Gopi. Krishnaveni told Bommi that we can reside in Deivanayagam's home because she is the best friend of his daughter-in-law Annalakshmi, so Bommi was advised by Krishnaveni that we might move in. In the flaskback, Annalakshmi offered Krishnaveni an ancestral chain requesting that their offspring marry each other to keep their friendship strong., but Deivanayagam's family did relocate to Chennai though for their business to succeed, hence Annalakshmi's request was not fulfilled. In the present, Krishnaveni went to Deivanayagam's house, Deivanayagam's son Padmanabham was adamant about not letting them in, but Sid agreed because she was his mother's friend. In accordance to Annalakshmi's wish, Deivanayagam decides for Bommi to wed Jagadeesh (Annalakshmi's adopted son). Due to Padmanabhan's evil plan, Jagadeesh quits the wedding while the wedding ceremony is still being performed, because Jagadeesh is an adopted son so Padmanabhan has always disliked him. Thus Sid chose to marry Bommi to not spoil Deivanayagam's reputation. In the end, Sid decides to take Bommi as his wife and enters the home to exact revenge on her. Now Sid and Bommi, slowly fall in love.

This story, which is rich in culture, is about love, family ties, and traditional sweets from Tamil Nadu. The narrative depicts Bommi and Sid's life.

Cast

Main 
 Swathi Sharma as Bommi – A sweet making woman from a poor background, entered as a daughter-in-law in Anjali Sweets family. She delivers the sweets in a motor cycle as Ganapathy Sweets for her late father's wish. 
 Siddharth's wife; Krishnaveni's daughter; Gopi's elder sister; Padmanaban and Annalakshmi's daughter-in-law; Ramya, Dharshini and Vinay's sister-in-law
 Anand Selvan as Siddharth – A rich businessman, hates his father and sweets after his mother's death. His family was popular in sweet selling under the banner Anjali Sweets, but he did not involved in it. 
 Bommi's husband; Deivanayagam and Anjali Devi's grandson; Padmanaban and Annalakshmi's son; Dharshini's elder brother; Ramya and Vinay's paternal cousin elder brother and Lokesh's maternal cousin brother

Recurring 
 Suresh Krishnamurthy as Deivanayagam: The Anjali Sweets founder; Anjali Devi's husband; grandfather of Siddharth, Ramya, Dharshini, Vinay and Lokesh; father of Padmanaban, Chidambaram and Valarmathi; father-in-law of Annalakshmi, Savithri, Sivagami and Raghuvaran
 Hema Srikanth as Anjali Devi: Deivanayagam's wife; grandmother of Siddharth, Ramya, Dharshini, Vinay and Lokesh; mother of Padmanaban, Chidambaram and Valarmathi; mother-in-law of Annalakshmi, Savithri, Sivagami and Raghuvaran
 Bala Subramanian as Padmanaban: Deivanayagam and Anjali Devi's elder son; Annalakshmi and Savithri's husband; Chithambaram and Valarmathi's elder brother; Siddharth, Dharshini and Mano's father; Jagadeesh's adopted father; Bommi, Preethi, Nivas and Tamannah's father-in-law
 Deepa Nethran as Annalakshmi: Padmanaban's wife; Deivanayagam and Anjali Devi's daughter-in-law; Siddharth and Dharshini's mother; Jagadeesh's adopted mother; Bommi, Preethi and Nivas's mother-in-law (Deceased) 
 Dr. Sharmila as Savithri: Padmanaban's second wife Deivanayagam and Anjali Devi's daughter-in-law; Mano's mother; Tamannah's mother-in-law (2022–present) 
 Arvind Kathare as Chidambaram: Deivanayagam and Anjali Devi's younger son; Padmanaban's younger brother; Valarmathi's elder brother; Sivagami's husband; Vinay and Ramya's father; Menaka's father-in-law
 Neela Menon (2021–2022) → Devi Teju (2022–present) as Sivagami: Chidambaram's wife; Deivanayagam and Anjali Devi's daughter-in-law; Vinay and Ramya's mother; Menaka's mother-in-law
 Akila as Valarmathi: Deivanayagam and Anjali Devi's daughter; Padmanaban and Chidambaram's younger sister; Raghuvaran's wife, Lokesh's mother; Siddharth, Ramya, Dharshini and Vinay's paternal aunt
 Krishnakumar as Raghuvaran: Valarmathi's husband; Deivanayagam and Anjali Devi's son-in-law; Lokesh's father; Siddharth, Ramya, Dharshini and Vinay's paternal uncle
 Mithun Raj as Jagadeesh: Adopted son of Annalakshmi against Padmanaban; Siddharth, Ramya, Dharshini, Vinay and Lokesh's adopted elder brother; Bommi's ex-fiancé; Preethi's husband
 Preethi Kumar as Preethi: Jagadeesh's wife; Rahul's ex-fiancée; Padmanaban and Annalakshmi's daughter-in-law; Arunachalam's daughter
 Neha Jha (2021) → Suveta Shrimpton (2022–present) as Tamannah: Siddharth's obsessive ex-girlfriend; Vinay's ex-fiancée; Mano’s wife; Padmanaban and Savithri's daughter-in-law; She entered as daughter-in-law in Anjali Sweets by marrying Mano, Padmanaban's second wife's son
 Gve Krishna as Mano: Tamannah's husband; Padmanaban and Savithri's son; Deivanayagam and Anjali Devi's grandson; Siddharth and Dharshini's half brother; Ramya and Vinay's parental cousin brother; Lokesh's maternal cousin brother
 Aruljothi Arockiaraj as Ramya: Deivanayagam and Anjali Devi's grand daughter; Chidambaram and Sivagami's daughter; Vinay's sister; Siddharth and Dharshini's paternal cousin sister; Lokesh's maternal cousin; Nivas's ex-fiancée; Adithya's ex-wife
 Deepthi Rajendran (2021) → Sreenidhi Sudarshan (2022) → Dhachayani (2022–present) as Dharshini: Deivanayagam and Anjali Devi's grand daughter; Padmanaban and Annalakshmi's daughter; Siddharth's sister; Ramya and Vinay's paternal cousin sister; Lokesh's maternal cousin; Nivas's wife
 Pranav Mohanan as Nivas: Dharshini's husband; Ramya's ex-fiancé; Padmanaban and Annalakshmi's son-in-law; Chandra's son
 RJ Saba (2021–2022) → Kutty Gopi (2022–present) as Lokesh: Deivanayagam and Anjali Devi's grandson; Raghuvaran and Valarmathi's son; Siddharth, Ramya, Dharshini and Vinay's paternal cousin brother
 Vicky Roshan (2021–2022) → Vasudeva Krish Madhusudhan (2022–present) as Vinay: Deivanayagam and Anjali Devi's grandson; Chidambaram and Sivagami's son; Ramya's brother; Siddharth and Dharshini's paternal cousin brother and Lokesh's maternal cousin brother; Tamannah's ex-fiancée; Menaka's husband
 Preetha Suresh as Menaka: Vinay's lover turned wife; Chithambaram and Sivagami's daughter-in-law
 Janane Prabhu as Nalini: A lawyer and Tamannah's mother
 Aarthi Ramkumar as Vinothini: Nalini's sister; Tamannah's maternal aunt
 Rishi as Sethupathi (Sethu): An IPS officer; Siddharth's close friend; Ramya's love interest
 Mukesh Kanna as Adithya: Ramya's ex-husband; Thirumoorthy's son; Nethra's younger brother
 Rajeshwari as Nethra: The Nethra Sweets owner; Thirumoorthy's daughter; Adithya’s elder sister; The Anjali Sweets's arch rival
 Gayathri Priya as Krishnaveni: Bommi and Gopi's mother; Annalakshmi's close friend
 Deepesh as Gopi: Bommi's younger brother and Krishnaveni's son
 Ranjana Sudharsan as Malliga: Sankunthala's daughter
 Iyyappan as Thavamani: Vasuki's younger brother and his intention was to marry Bommi but it fails
 Pondy Ravi as Azhagesan: Krishnaveni's brother-in-law
 Suchithra as Sakunthala: Azhagesan's wife and Thavamani's elder sister
 Ravi Shankar as Arunachalam: Siddharth's business head and Preethi's father
 Naresh Raj as Rahul: Preethi's ex-fiancé 
 Keerthana Podhuval as Swetha / Meera: Siddharth's college ex-lover
 Ameen Fakkir as Ram: A Sub-inspector of police; Sethu's junior officer
 Madhan as Indhar: Dharshini's college friend
 Manoj Kumar as Thirumoorthy: The Nethra Sweets founder; Nethra and Adithya's father
 Nithya Krishnan as Chandra: Nivas's mother
 Krishna as Nivas's father; Raghuvaran's younger brother

Special appearances 
 Kuyili as Eshwari: Deivanayagam's elder sister
 Aishwarya Bhaskaran as Bommi's aunt
 Sonia Agarwal as herself: A Judge for a sweet competition 
 Livingston as Amarthalingam: A sweet making cook
 Malgudi Subha as herself for Navarathri special episodes
 Nanda Gopal as himself for Navarathri special episodes
 Ashwanth Ashokkumar as Child: Navarathri special episodes

Special and Crossover episodes
 On 3 October 2021, Ninaithale Inikkum held a wedding episode as Ninaithale Inikkum Mega Thirumana Vaibhavam for Siddharth and Bommi's marriage, which is aired for non-stop two and half hours on Sunday.
 On 23 January 2022, Ninaithale Inikkum held a MEGA episode as Ninaithale Innikum MEGA Sunday Kondattam for Jagadheesh and Preethi's marriage, which is aired for non-stop two and half hours on Sunday.
 On 13 February 2022, Ninaithale Inikkum with Sathya 2 and Sembaruthi series's main leads joined for a special episode as Kadhal Sangamam, which is aired for non-stop two and half hours on Sunday.
 On 18 September 2022, Ninaithale Innikum held a MEGA Episode titled as Ninaithale Innikum Sunday Special  for Vinay- Menakha and Mano- Tamannah's marriage, which is aired for non-stop two hours on Sunday.

Adaptations

Reception
On its second week from launch, Ninaithale Inikkum becomes the most watched series and grabbed first position in Zee Tamil in Urban and Urban+Rural markets'' and occupies top in TRP charts.

This is the first series in Zee Tamil, which gets reach faster among the audience.

References

External links 
 
 Ninaithale Inikkum at ZEE5

Zee Tamil original programming
Tamil-language romance television series
2021 Tamil-language television series debuts
Tamil-language television series based on Bengali-languages television series
Tamil-language television soap operas
Television shows set in Tamil Nadu